Noble Jones Gregory (August 30, 1897 – September 26, 1971) was a Democrat, who represented Kentucky for eleven terms in the United States House of Representatives, from 1937 to 1959.

Biography
Gregory was born and raised in Mayfield, Kentucky. One of his siblings was an older brother, William Voris Gregory, who became a politician and US Congressman.

The younger Gregory worked in various positions at the First National Bank of Mayfield from 1917 through 1936.  From 1923 to 1936 he also served as secretary-treasurer of the Mayfield Board of Education.

In 1936 William Voris Gregory was an incumbent already re-nominated by the Democratic Party for re-election in when he died on October 10 of that year. Noble Jones Gregory was nominated for his late brother's seat. In 1936 Gregory was elected to the United States House of Representatives, representing Kentucky's 1st district in the far western part of the state.  He was re-elected ten times, serving for 22 years during his eleven terms in the House. At this time, the Democratic primary was the only competitive contest in this part of the state, which overwhelmingly supported Democratic candidates. Most blacks, who had previously supported the Republican Party, were still disenfranchised. Gregory did not sign the 1956 Southern Manifesto but voted against the Civil Rights Act of 1957.

In 1958 Gregory sought re-election to his seat but was defeated in the Democratic primary by Frank Stubblefield; he won the general election. After being defeated, Gregory returned to the banking and investment business in Mayfield. He is buried in Maplewood Cemetery in Mayfield.

References

1897 births
1971 deaths
People from Mayfield, Kentucky
Democratic Party members of the United States House of Representatives from Kentucky
20th-century American politicians